Alexander Dawson Henderson (February 28, 1865 – January 5, 1925) was an American businessman. He was vice president, first treasurer and founding investor of the California Perfume Company (CPC), which later became Avon Products.

Biography

Early life

Henderson was born on February 28, 1865, in Brooklyn, New York. He was the child of Joseph Henderson and Angelina A Henderson. Henderson married Ella Margaret Brown. Alexander and Ella had three children including Alexander D. Henderson Jr. and Girard B. Henderson.

In 1906, Henderson built a home in Suffern, New York, after having visited there as summer visitors several times. That house burnt down in 1941.

Professional life 
In 1890, Henderson worked for the Union Warehouse Company in New York City where he held the position of private Secretary to Edward B. Bartlett. In 1892, Henderson loaned E. B. Bartlett $25,000 and received 250 shares of the Union Warehouse Company stock as collateral. When Bartlett died in 1894, Henderson had to go to court to recover his investment. In 1897, in the case Henderson v. Bartlett, the jury in the Supreme Court of the State of New York returned a verdict for $30,300 for the amount claimed.

On May 30, 1895, he became the bookkeeper for David H. McConnell of the California Perfume Company. He went on to become Vice-President and Treasurer of CPC.

As early as 1901, Henderson and McConnell were listed in the Trow Copartnership and Corporation Directory as "The California Perfume Co., (RTN) David H McConnell, Alexander D Henderson, at 126 Chambers Street."

On June 16, 1909, an agreement was made between David H. McConnell and Alexander D. Henderson as partners trading as D. H. McConnell and Company, Goetting and Company, and California Perfume Company to sell these holdings over to the California Perfume Company, a corporation of the State of New Jersey. The bill of sale was for $220,000.00.

On January 28, 1916, the California Perfume Company was incorporated in New York State. Henderson and McConnell attended the American Perfumer annual meetings from May 9–11, 1916.

In March 1912, Henderson invested in the incorporation of the Hatfield Auto Truck Company of Elmira, New York, with capital of $1,500,000.

In June 1915, Henderson took the train to San Francisco, California, to set up a booth to advertise and exhibit CPC perfume products at the 1914-1915 Panama–Pacific International Exposition. The CPC exhibit was in the Liberal Arts Building. A Gold Medal was awarded to the company for the quality of the products and the beauty of the packaging.

Personal life
Henderson assisted in the designing and building of the Lafayette Theatre in Suffern, New York. Henderson became treasurer and director of the Ramapo Valley Independent when the old Suffern Independent was sold in 1922. Henderson died on January 5, 1925.

Death
On January 5, 1925, Henderson died, at age 60, in Suffern, New York.

See also

 Avon Products
 Joseph Henderson (Pilot)
 David H. McConnell

References

External links

Alexander D. Henderson at California Perfume Company website

1865 births
1925 deaths
Postcards
American manufacturing businesspeople
People from Brooklyn
People from Suffern, New York
People associated with direct selling
20th-century American businesspeople